The Urban agglomeration of Sainte-Agathe-des-Monts is an urban agglomeration in Quebec that consists of:
the city of Sainte-Agathe-des-Monts
the municipality of Ivry-sur-le-Lac

History
As part of the 2000–2006 municipal reorganization in Quebec, the City of Sainte-Agathe-des-Monts was created on February 27, 2002 by the merger of the city of Sainte-Agathe-des-Monts, the municipality of Sainte-Agathe-Nord, and the municipality of Ivry-sur-le-Lac.  Following a 2004 referendum Ivry-sur-le-Lac de-merged and became an independent municipality again on January 1, 2006.

However, the legislation governing the de-merger process provided for the creation of a new municipal structure, an urban agglomeration, which would continue to tie de-merged cities to their former partners for the provision of various municipal services.

See also
 Urban agglomerations in Quebec
 Municipal history of Quebec

Sainte-Agathe-des-Monts
Urban agglomerations in Quebec